Miodrag Jovanović (Serbian Cyrillic: Миодраг Јовановић; born 10 July 1986) is a Serbian footballer.

Jovanović played for FK Napredak Kruševac in the Serbian SuperLiga.

References

1986 births
Living people
Serbian footballers
Serbian expatriate footballers
FK Mladi Obilić players
FK Srem players
FK Napredak Kruševac players
FK Pobeda players
Expatriate footballers in North Macedonia
Association football defenders